"Carols" is the thirty-fourth single released by Ayumi Hamasaki. It was released on September 29, 2004. It became her 21st single to claim the No. 1 spot on the Oricon charts and has sold over 380,000 copies to date. Carols is to date Hamasaki's only single to be released on the DVD-Audio and SACD formats. It was the last single to be released from the album My Story.

Music video

The music video premiered a few days before the release and was directed by Masashi Muto. The video, filmed in black and white, features Hamasaki singing in an empty theatre.

Track listing
 Carols – 5:30
 Carols "Criminal Tribal Mix" – 6:45
 Carols "Hammond B-3 Whisper" – 5:47
 Carols "Original Mix ~instrumental~" – 5:30

DVD
 Carols (PV)

Live performances
September 24, 2004 – PopJam
September 24, 2004 – Music Station
September 26, 2004 – CDTV
September 30, 2004 – AX Music
October 8, 2004 – Music Station
October 18, 2004 – Hey! Hey! Hey!
December 15, 2004 – Best Artist
December 24, 2004 – Music Station

Charts
Oricon Sales Chart (Japan)

  Total Sales :  375,000 (Japan)
  Total Sales :  380,000 (Avex)
 RIAJ certification: Platinum

References

External links
 "Carols" information at Avex Network.
 "Carols" CD+DVD information at Avex Network.
 "Carols" information at Oricon.

Ayumi Hamasaki songs
2004 singles
Oricon Weekly number-one singles
Songs written by Ayumi Hamasaki
Song recordings produced by Max Matsuura
2004 songs
Avex Trax singles